Baldia Colony is one of the neighborhoods of Baldia Town in Karachi, Sindh, Pakistan.

Baldia was established as a katchi abadi after 1958. It was estimated to contain 1 million people.

There are several ethnic groups including Muhajirs, Punjabis, Sindhis, Kashmiris, Seraikis, Pakhtuns, Balochis, Memons, ( Hazarewal) Bohras and Ismailis.  Over 99% of the population is Muslim.

References

External links 
 Karachi Website.
 Baldia Town.

Neighbourhoods of Karachi
Squatting in Pakistan